Gone with the Bullets (Chinese: 一步之遥) is a 2014 Chinese film directed by Jiang Wen and also starring Jiang Wen, Ge You, Zhou Yun and Shu Qi. Production started on location in Beijing at the China Film Group studio in Huairou on October 2, 2013. Production wrapped before the Chinese New Year holiday. The film was released on December 18, 2014. It was screened in the main competition section of the 65th Berlin International Film Festival.

The film was named 2014's "smokiest movie" by an anti-smoking group in China, featuring 45 smoking scenes in all, equivalent to someone smoking every 3.1 minutes.

Roles
These are the roles.

Mans
Ray(雷伊, 雷伊)

Gaia(蓋亞, 盖亚)

Cassius(卡修斯, 卡修斯)

Blacke(布萊克, 布莱克)

Miris(米瑞斯, 米瑞斯)

Plot
The film is set in 1920s Shanghai, surrounding a beauty pageant.

Cast
 Jiang Wen as Ma Zouri
 Ge You as Xiang Feitian
 Zhou Yun
 Shu Qi
 Wen Zhang
 Wang Zhiwen
 Hung Huang
 Harrison Liu
 Na Ying
 Liu Sola
 Niu Ben

Box office
By January 9, 2015, the film had earned ¥511.14 million at the Chinese box office.

References

External links
 

2014 films
Films set in the 1920s
Films set in Shanghai
Films directed by Jiang Wen
IMAX films
Chinese action comedy films